Dibbine    is a small village in the  Marjeyoun District in southern Lebanon, located just north of Marjeyoun.

History
In 1596, it was named as a village,  Dibin, in the Ottoman nahiya (subdistrict) of  Tibnin  under the liwa' (district) of Safad, with a population of 41  households and 6 bachelors, all Muslim. The villagers paid a  fixed tax-rate of 25 % on  agricultural products, such as wheat, barley, olive trees, "dulab harir", goats, beehives; in addition to occasional revenues, a press for olive oil or grape syrup; a total of 3,969 akçe.

In 1838, Eli Smith noted Dibbine as a predominantly Metawileh and Greek Christian village.

References

Bibliography

External links
 Dibbine, Localiban

Populated places in Marjeyoun District